Eunomics is a term, first proposed by legal scholar Lon Fuller in 1954, to describe "the science, theory or study of good order and workable arrangements".<ref>Fuller, Lon L. (1954). American Legal Philosophy at Mid-Century - A Review of Edwin W. Patterson's Jurisprudence, Men and Ideas of the Law, p. 477</ref> Stemming from Behavioral Systems Theory, it was an attempt to fuse what Fuller saw as the inherent morality of law with the empirical data and methods of the objective sciences. Its main practical application appears to be as a form of industrial dispute resolution.

 Relationship with New Institutional Economics

Nobel prize winner Oliver E. Williamson, a leading mind of the New Institutional Economics (NIE) movement, refers to Fuller's definition of eunomics as a simulacrum of his understanding of the term governance. Same as with the NIE, eunomics are foremost concerned with the question how to achieve a desired outcome.

 Notes

 Sources

 Williamson, Oliver E. (1996): The Mechanisms of Governance'', Oxford University Press, p. 11

Theories
Philosophy of law